Density and dense usually refer to a measure of how much of some entity is within a fixed amount of space. Types of density include:

Physics

Density of mass
Density, mass per unit volume
Bulk density, mass of a particulate solid or powder divided by the volume it occupies
Particle density (packed density) or true density, density of the particles that make up a particulate solid or a powder
Neutral density, mass density of seawater
Area density or surface density, mass over a (two-dimensional) area
Linear density, mass over a (one-dimensional) line
Relative density or specific gravity, a measure of density in comparison to the density of something else
Vapour density, a relative density used for gases

Densities of other entities
Number density, number of particles per unit volume, area, or length
Current density, the ratio of electric current to area
Charge density, the electric charge per volume
Energy density, potential energy per unit volume or mass, depending on context
Force density, force per unit volume
Optical density, the absorbance of a material
Densitometry, measuring the optical density of photographic paper, photographic film and x-ray film
Particle density (particle count), number of particles per unit volume
Power density, power per unit volume
Surface power density, power per unit area

Mathematics

Probability and measure theory
Probability density function, a function which maps probabilities across the real line and whose integral is 1
Density estimation is the construction of an estimate of a probability density function
Kernel density estimation, used in statistics to estimate a probability density function of a random variable
Lebesgue's density theorem

Number theory
Schnirelmann density
Natural density (also called asymptotic density)
Dirichlet density

Geometry
Packing density
Density (polytope)
Density on a manifold
Tensor density in differential geometry

Topology
Dense set and nowhere dense set
Dense-in-itself is a set that contains no isolated points

Other fields
Density (graph theory), the fraction of possible edges that exist in a graph
Dense order in order theory
A coinitial subset in the mathematical theory of forcing, in set theory
Dense submodule in abstract algebra

Other scientific fields
Population density, population per unit land area
Urban density, in urban planning and urban design
Areal density (computer storage), bits (how computers store information) over an amount of area or volume
Nutrient density, the proportion of any array of a single nutrient or nutritional factor, or of numerous nutrients in foods, often ordered by different scalar indices

Culture and arts
Stupidity, a stupid person is sometimes referred to as being "dense"
Dense (film), a 2004 film
Density 21.5 – a piece of music for solo flute written by Edgard Varèse

See also
Concentration
Flux
Intensity (physics)

Mathematics disambiguation pages